Aeneas Chisholm (1759–1818) was a Roman Catholic bishop who served as the Vicar Apostolic of the Highland District, Scotland.

Life
Born in Strathglass, Inverness in 1759, he was ordained a priest in 1783. He was appointed the Coadjutor Vicar Apostolic of Highland District and Titular Bishop of Diocaesarea in Palaestina by the Holy See on 11 May 1804. He was consecrated to the Episcopate at the Lismore Seminary on 15 September 1805. 

The principal consecrator was Bishop Alexander Cameron, Vicar Apostolic of the Lowland District. Following the death of his brother Bishop John Chisholm on 8 July 1814, Aeneas automatically succeeded as the Vicar Apostolic of Highland District.

He died at Lismore on 31 July 1818, aged 59.

References

1759 births
1818 deaths
19th-century Roman Catholic bishops in Scotland
Apostolic vicars of Scotland
Scottish Roman Catholic bishops